Becky Cash is an American politician serving as a member of the Indiana House of Representatives from the 25th district. She assumed office on November 9, 2022.

Career 
Cash earned a bachelor's degree from Bowling Green State University in 1998. Cash's career experience includes working as a business owner and a naturopathic practitioner where she has her own practice in Indianapolis.

Personal life 
Cash was born in Green Bay, Wisconsin. She is married to her husband, Chris, and has six children.

References 

Indiana politicians
Republican Party members of the Indiana House of Representatives
Year of birth missing (living people)
Living people